Derrick Dillon (born October 28, 1995) is an American football wide receiver for the Memphis Showboats of the United States Football League (USFL). He played college football at LSU.

Early life and high school
Dillon attended Pine High School in Franklinton, Louisiana. Dillon initially committed to Florida but switched his commitment to LSU.

College career
Dillon redshirted his freshman year and played eight games, primarily on special teams as a redshirt freshman. As a sophomore in 2017, he rushed for 86 yards on 15 rushes and added 125 yards on 14 receptions. Dillon caught a 71-yard, fourth-quarter touchdown reception against Auburn in 2018. He also had a 49-yard touchdown pass from Joe Burrow in the Fiesta Bowl victory over UCF. Dillon caught 22 passes for 307 yards and two touchdowns as a junior. He underwent hip surgery in February 2019 and missed spring practices. Dillon caught two passes for 22 yards against Oklahoma in the 2019 College Football Playoff Semifinal. As a senior in 2019, Dillon made 15 catches for 202 yards and two touchdowns. He started three games when Terrace Marshall Jr. was out with an injury. Dillon participated in the East-West Shrine Bowl. in his career, Dillon caught 51 passes for 634 yards and four touchdowns. In a makeshift pro day after the LSU event was cancelled, Dillon ran a 4.29 in a 40-yard dash.

Professional career

New York Giants
After going undrafted in the 2020 NFL Draft, Dillon signed an undrafted free agent deal with the New York Giants. He was given a $15,000 signing bonus in addition to a guaranteed salary of $25,000 for the 2020 season. He was waived on September 5, 2020, and signed to the practice squad the next day. He was released from the practice squad on September 8 and re-signed again on September 16. He was released on December 1, 2020. He signed a reserve/future contract with the Giants on January 5, 2021. He was placed on injured reserve on August 3, 2021. Dillon was cut by the Giants on August 11.

Tampa Bay Bandits
Dillon was selected in the 15th round of the 2022 USFL Draft by the Tampa Bay Bandits.

Cleveland Browns
On August 1, 2022, Dillon signed with the Cleveland Browns. He was waived by the Browns on August 15, 2022.

Memphis Showboats
Dillon signed with the Memphis Showboats of the USFL on January 11, 2023.

Personal life
Dillon's father Earl Cotton died on March 7, 2018, due to complications from a bacterial infection. Dillon has two sisters.

References

External links
LSU Tigers bio

1995 births
Living people
People from Franklinton, Louisiana
Players of American football from Louisiana
American football wide receivers
LSU Tigers football players
New York Giants players
Tampa Bay Bandits (2022) players
Cleveland Browns players